Cedecea davisae is a gram-negative, motile, rod-shaped, non-sporulating lipase positive bacteria.

Phylogeny and genome evolution 
The bacteria falls into the genus Cedecae, which was discovered by the Centers for Disease Control and Prevention in 1977 and determined to be its own genus in 1981. There are five different species within the genus Cadecea: C. davisae, C. lapangei, C. netri, Cedecea spp. 3, and Cedecea spp. 5.  The classification of this organism from Kingdom to species is Bacteria, Proteobacteria, Gammaproteobacteria, Enterobacterales, Cedecea, davisae. It is described as an emerging pathogen, due to it being discovered fairly recently.

Metabolic details 
Cedecea davisae is a part of the Enterobacteriaceae family.  This family is well known for being Chemoorganoheterotrophs and therefore it is safe to assume that Cedecea davisae is most likely a Chemoorganoheterotroph, meaning it gets its energy and carbon from other sources than itself, although research has not clearly stated this.

Relevance to human health 
Cedecea davisae is an opportunistic pathogen, meaning its presence will only cause an infection to its host in the right circumstances. Such conditions can include advanced age, renal disease, Cystic Fibrosis as well as other comorbidities. When Cedecea davisae is provided with any of these optimal conditions, it can play an important role in a variety of bacterial infections that can take place in the human body.   One of the infections that Cedecea davisae has been found in is a rare bacteremia, the presence of bacteria in circulating blood, in patients with chronic renal disease which causes chills, fever, nausea and diarrhea in its host. It has also been shown that Cedecea davisae can be found in polymicrobial pulmonary infections in patients who have been diagnosed with Cystic Fibrosis. Other research suggests that it can cause other infections in the skin, soft tissue and lung infections as well as other catheter-related blood infections.

With the antibiotic resistance Cedecea davisae has acquired, it can be difficult to treat such rare infections.   The cell walls of the bacterium have few porins giving it a great broad sense antibiotic resistance because drugs have a hard time getting into the periplasm of the bacteria. Additionally, AmpC production splits the beta lactam ring that is essential for the drug to harm bioactivity within the bacteria.

References

Further reading
 

Enterobacteriaceae
Bacteria genera